Labor History is a peer-reviewed academic journal which publishes articles regarding the history of the labor movement in the United States, Europe, and other regions and countries.

Publication history 
The journal was established in 1953 as the Labor Historian's Bulletin, and later incorporated Newsletter. In 1960, the journal changed its name to Labor History and was being published by the Tamiment Institute, later to be published by CarFax, a subsidiary of Taylor & Francis.
In 2003 the journal was sold to Taylor and Francis. Following conflicts with the new publisher over editorial independence, editor-in-chief Leon Fink, the entire editorial board, and much of the editorial staff left to establish a rival journal, Labor: Studies in Working-Class History.

The journal is currently published by Routledge, an imprint of Taylor and Francis.  The current editor is Craig Phelan of Solidarity Center (Abuja, Nigeria), US editor Gerald Friedman of the University of Massachusetts-Amherst, and book review editor John Trumpbour of Harvard University.

Since 2013, the journal is being published 5 times a year.

Abstracting and indexing
The journal is abstracted and/or indexed in Alternative Press Index, America: History and Life, Historical Abstracts, Political Science Complete, Scopus, SocINDEX, and Web of Science.

Editors

In 1974, Daniel Leab became editor and served the journal for more than two decades.

Awards
Each year, Labor History awards a number of writing prizes. Honors are given to the best essay on an American topic, best essay on a non-American or comparative topic, best essay written by a scholar within five years of completion of their Ph.D., best labor-themed dissertation, and best book on labor.

References

External links
 

Labour journals
History journals
Publications established in 1953
Taylor & Francis academic journals
English-language journals
Quarterly journals